The necropolis of Sheikh Abd el-Qurna is located on the West Bank at Thebes in Upper Egypt. It is part of the archaeological area of Deir el-Bahari, and named after the domed tomb of the local saint. This is the most frequently visited cemetery on the Theban west bank, with the largest concentration of private tombs.

Tombs
 TT21 User, Scribe, Steward of king Thutmose I
 TT22 Wah, later usurped by Meryamun
 TT23 – Tjay
 TT30 Khonsmose, Amun treasury official, Ramesside
 TT31 – Khonsu
 TT38 Djeserkaraseneb, Scribe, Counter of grain in the granary of the divine offerings of Amun
 TT41 Amenemopet called Ipy, Amun temple high steward
 TT42 Amenmose, Captain of troops, Eyes of the King in the Two Lands of the Retenu
 TT43 Neferrenpet, Overseer of the kitchen (stores?) of Pharaoh
 TT44 Amenemhab, wab-priest in front of Amun
 TT45 Djehuty, Steward of high priest of Amun Mery
 TT46 Ramose, Steward of the Mansion of the Aten, Fanbearer at the right of the King, Overseer of the granaries of Upper and Lower Egypt

TT50 - TT139:
 TT51 – Userhat called Neferhabef
 TT52 – Nakht
 TT55 – Ramose
 TT57 – Khaemhat called Mahu
 TT66 – Hepu
 TT69 – Menna
 TT71 – Senenmut (unused)
 TT83 - Amethu called Ahmose
 TT96 – Sennefer
 TT100 – Rekhmire
 TT109 – the tutor Min
 TT120 – Anen
 TT170 Nebmehyt, Scribe of recruits of the Ramesseum in the estate of Amun
 TT171 Unknown
 TT224 Ahmose Humay (J'h-ms, Hm.j), Overseer of the estate of the God's Wife, Overseer of the double granaries of the God's Wife Ahmose-Nefertary
 TT225 unknown / perhaps Amenemhet, High priest of Hathor
 TT226 Heqareshu (Hq3-ršw), Royal scribe, Overseer of nurses of the king
 TT227 Unknown
 TT228 Amen(em)mose (Jmn-msj(w)), Scribe of the Amun treasury
 TT229 Unknown
 TT230 Men (?) (Mn), Scribe of troops of Pharaoh
 TT249 Neferrenpet (Nfr-rnp.t), supplier of dates/cakesin the temple of Amenhotep III
 TT251 Amenmose, Royal scribe, Overseer of cattle of Amun, Overseer of magazine of Amun
 TT252 Senimen (Sn(.j)-mn(.w)), Steward, Nurse of the God's Wife
 TT259 Hori (Hr.j), wab-priest, Scribe in all the monuments of the estate of Amun, Head of the outline-draughtsmen in the Gold House of the Amun domain
 TT263 Piay (Pj3jj), Scribe in the granary in the Amun domain, Scribe of accounts in the Ramesseum
 TT269 Unknown
 TT280 Meketre (Mk.t(.j)-R'), Chief Steward, Chancellor, early Middle Kingdom
 TT309 Unknown
 TT317 Thutnefer, Scribe of the counting of corn in the granary of divine offerings of Amun
 TT318 Amenmose, Necropolis-worker of Amun
 TT331 Penne (P3-n-njwt, P3-n-nwt) called Sunero (Srr, Sw-n-r3), High priest of Monthu

TT341-TT351
 TT343 – Benia
 TT367 Paser, Head of the Bowmen, Child of the nursery, Companion of His Majesty
 TT368 Amenhotep Huy, Overseer of sculptors of Amun in Thebes
 TT384 Nebmehyt (Nb-mhj.t), Priest of Amun in the Ramesseum
 TT385 Hunefer (H3w-nfr), Mayor of Thebes, Overseer of the granary of divine offerings of Amun
 TT391 Kerebasken (K3-r-b3-s3-kn, Krbskn), Prophet of Khonsemweset-Neferhotep, Fourth prophet of Amun, Mayor of the City

TT397-TT400

 TT403 Merymaat (Mrj-m3'.t), Temple scribe, Steward
Miscellaneous 

 Sheikh Abd el-Qurna cache, a reburial of several 18th Dynasty princesses

See also
 Sheikh Abd el-Qurna cache
 List of Theban Tombs
 Qurna

References

External links

List of Tombs in Qurna, Western Thebes
TT71 Tomb of Senenmut and his parents

Theban tombs

hu:Sejh Abd el-Kurna-i rejtekhely